Kendall Tucker Toman  (born November 12, 2003) is an American professional baseball third baseman in the Toronto Blue Jays organization. He is ranked 4th on Major League Baseball's 2022 Top 30 Blue Jays prospects list.

Amateur career
Toman was born in Columbia, South Carolina, and attended the Hammond School. He began playing on Hammond's varsity baseball team when he was in the eighth grade. Toman is committed to play college baseball at LSU. As a junior, Toman hit .502 with eight home runs, and 25 RBIs. Following the season he played for the under-18 US National Baseball team. He was named a preseason All-American by Baseball America entering his senior season. Toman finished the season with a .487 batting average, seven home runs, and 27 RBIs.

Professional career 
The Toronto Blue Jays selected Toman 77th overall in the 2022 Major League Baseball draft. He signed with the Blue Jays on July 24, 2022, and received an over-slot $2 million signing bonus.

Personal life
Toman is the son of Middle Tennessee State head baseball coach Jim Toman.

References

External links

Living people
2003 births
Baseball players from South Carolina
Baseball third basemen
Florida Complex League Blue Jays players